Crinitothrips is a genus of thrips in the family Phlaeothripidae.

Species
 Crinitothrips amabilis
 Crinitothrips murphyi
 Crinitothrips roomi
 Crinitothrips setosus
 Crinitothrips spinulatus

References

Phlaeothripidae
Thrips
Thrips genera